American Gun may refer to:

 American Gun (2002 film)
 American Gun (2005 film)
 American Guns, 2011-12 TV show